State Route 69 (SR 69) is a state highway in West and Middle Tennessee that runs parallel to the Tennessee River for the majority of its length. SR 69 carries both primary and secondary highway designations and is routed through rural areas.

Route description

Wayne, Hardin and McNairy Counties

SR 69 begins in Wayne County at the Alabama border near Florence, AL, continuing as (AL) SR 20. It runs a short distance in Wayne County, with no major intersections, and crosses into Hardin County. It then goes through Walnut Grove and begins a northwest course. It then turns north and enters Maddox and intersects SR 226. It continues north through Walkertown and enters Savannah. In Savannah, it has a junction with SR 203. A short distance later, it intersects and becomes concurrent with SR 128/US 64/SR 15. After a couple of blocks, SR 128 separates and turns south. SR 69/US 64/SR 15 continue west, cross the Tennessee River, and exits Savannah. It continues to Crump, where SR 22 joins the concurrency. Shortly afterwards, SR 69 separates and turns north alone, and goes through Morris Chapel. It continues north and enters McNairy County and immediately comes to another junction and concurrency with SR 22 and they enter Milledegeville. In Milledgeville, it has a junction with SR 22A, one of only 3 alternate routes in the state. SR 69 then separates from SR 22 at the same intersection and turns east, returning to Hardin County. It enters the community of Lebanon and has a junction with SR 421. It continues east to intersect SR 104 before entering Saltillo. In Saltillo, SR 69 makes a sharp left turn and starts going north. Then it leaves Saltillo, starts running along the banks of the Tennessee River, and leaves Hardin County for the second and final time, crossing into Decatur County.

Decatur County

It then turns east again and junctions with SR 202. It then turns north again and becomes concurrent with SR 114 in Bath Springs, and continues north. Shortly afterwards, it comes to an intersection with US 641, where SR 114 turns south to be its unsigned companion route while SR 69 turns north to become concurrent with it and become its unsigned companion route. They then have another junction with SR 202 and it joins the concurrency. They then enter Decaturville and intersect SR 100. A short distance away, SR 202 separates and turns west, and US 641/SR 69 continues north leaving Decaturville. The highway then crosses the Beech River and enters Parsons to have an intersection with US 412/SR 20 in the center of town. They then leave Parsons and continue north to Holladay, where they have an interchange with I-40 and cross into Benton County.

Benton County

Further north, still in Holladay, US 641/SR 69 intersect SR 192, a loop through the center of Holladay and the former routing of US 641/SR 69. Continuing north, they junction with the other end of SR 192 and leave Holladay. They then enter Camden and have a junction with US 70/SR 1. They continue into Camden and intersect with US 70 Bus/SR 391, which leads to SR 69A (Old US 641/SR 69), one of only 3 alternate routes in the state, and downtown. They then exit Camden, with SR 69A paralleling them for a short ways, before diverting onto its own path. US 641/SR 69 then cross into Henry County.

Henry County

They then have a junction with SR 218 before entering Paris. Shortly afterwards, they intersect with the other end of SR 69A, and revert to their original routing. They then intersect with the northern terminus of SR 77, and continue into downtown, having a junction with US 79/SR 76 before having an intersection with SR 54 and SR 356. Here, US 641 continues north to Kentucky with SR 54 becoming its companion route, with SR 69 separating from US 641 and becoming signed again. It also turns west onto SR 54 for a short distance before turning north again. It has another junction with SR 218 before leaving Paris, alone. Continuing north, it then has an intersection and short concurrency with SR 140 in Cottage Grove. SR 69 then crosses into Kentucky south of Bell City and continues as KY 97.

The vast majority of this highway is two-lane with no access control. In Hardin County, there are two separate sections of this road due to the path of the Tennessee River through this area.

Points of interest
Pickwick Landing State Park
Paris Landing State Park
Nathan Bedford Forrest State Park

History
SR 192 and SR 69A both represent old alignments of SR 69 in Benton County. There are also numerous other unsigned historical sections that are named 'Old Highway 69' in Benton & Decatur county. These alignments generally run nearby the present day SR 69 and most feature narrow roadway width and extensive curves.

In 1977, US 641 was extended southward (from its original southern terminus at Paris) along the path of SR 69 to the interchange with I-40 (Exit 126) near Holladay with SR 69 continuing south beyond the interchange.

In November 2014, AASHTO approved a southern extension of the US 641 designation along SR 69, from the former southern terminus at I-40 to the current end at US 64 in Wayne County.

Counties traversed
SR 69/SR 69A traverses the following counties shown in the table below.

Major intersections

Alternate route

SR 69 is one of only three state highways in Tennessee that have a signed alternate route. It serves the town of Big Sandy and provides access to rural northern Benton County and southeastern Henry County. SR 69A is a narrow and very curvy two-lane highway throughout its entire length, except for a short portion in Paris where SR 69A is a five-lane road with four-lanes and one center turn. SR 69A is known as 'Old Highway 69' in Benton County and a few old mileposts still exist indicating '69' on the bottom of the sign, as opposed to newer mileposts which indicate '69A'.

References
Tennessee Department of Transportation
Wayne County, TN Highway Map
Hardin County, TN Highway Map
McNairy County, TN Highway Map
Decatur County, TN Highway Map
Benton County, TN Highway Map
Henry County, TN Highway Map

Specific

069
069
069
069
069
069
069